Charles Lee is an American environmental justice activist and the senior policy advisor in the Office of Environmental Justice at the Environmental Protection Agency. Previously, he served as the director of the Office of Environmental Justice, and before that, he was the director of the Environmental Justice Program at the United Church of Christ for 15 years.

During the 1970s, Lee was a shop steward with District 1199 hospital workers union

In 1987, the United Church of Christ released a report entitled Toxic Wastes and Race in the United States, of which Lee was the principal author. The report has been described as "groundbreaking" and as "the first report to use rigorous analysis and methods to show how pollution and environmental hazards were disproportionately affecting minority and low-income communities." It had a much more rapid impact than Lee had anticipated: within six years, all of its recommendations had been implemented.

In 2017 he was honored by the House of Representatives in South Carolina and invited to give the keynote address at the University of South Carolina School of Public Health and Department of Environmental Health Services Seminar.

References

External links
Interview with Charles Lee, United Church of Christ

Living people
Environmental justice
American environmentalists
United States Environmental Protection Agency
American anti-racism activists
United Church of Christ members
Year of birth missing (living people)